Virginie Joron (born 11 December 1973, in Troyes) is a French politician. She was elected in the Regional council of the Grand Est in 2016 and in 2019 as a Member of the European Parliament in 2019.

References

Living people
National Rally (France) MEPs
MEPs for France 2019–2024
21st-century women MEPs for France
1973 births
People from Troyes
Côte d'Azur University alumni